Prelude of Lotus Lantern is a 2009 Chinese mythology fantasy television series. The television series directed by Hong Kong director Mang San Yu and written by Wang Biao, and starring Vincent Chiao, Zhou Yang, Liu Xiaoqing and Liu Tao. It tells the story of Erlang Shen, a popular Chinese God in Chinese mythology.  The series serve as a prequel of the 2005's Lotus Lantern (TV series)

Plot

This is the prequel to Lotus Lantern. The story this time focus on around Chen Xiang's uncle Er Lang Shen and his mother Sanshengmu .

Cast 
 Vincent Chiao as Erlang Shen (Yang Jian).
Niu Junfeng as young Erlang Shen 
 Zhou Yang as Sanshengmu, a niece of Jade Emperor, the third daughter of Yaoji.
 Liu Xiaoqing as Xi Wangmu.
 Liu Tao as Yaoji.
 Li Guangjie as Yang Tianyou.
 Jenny Guo as the seventh fairy.
 Kira Lu as Bamei.
 Li Xinru as Chang'e.
 Wang Weiguo as Jade Emperor.
 Tan Xiaoyan as Guanyin.
 Alvin Wong as Yuding Zhenren.
 Wu Guohua as Taiyi Zhenren.
 Xie Ning as Zhu Bajie.
 Ding Jian as Sun Wukong.
 Chen Chuang as Xiaotianquan
 Song Zuer as Nezha.
 Yvonne Lim as Princess San, the third daughter of Dragon King.
 Cao Jun as Chenxiang. (Guest Star in episode 46)

Production
The television series shot the scene in Zhuozhou World Studios of Zhuozhou city, Hebei province, China.

It was a hot TV series in CCTV-8 and one of the most watched ones in mainland China in that year.

References

External links
  Prelude of Lotus Lantern Sina

2009 Chinese television series debuts
Shenmo television series
2009 Chinese television series endings
China Central Television original programming